The 2012–13 Radford Highlanders men's basketball team represented Radford University during the 2012–13 NCAA Division I men's basketball season. The Highlanders, led by second year head coach Mike Jones, played their home games at Dedmon Center and were members of the North Division of the Big South Conference. They finished the season 13–19, 7–9 in Big South play to finish in tie for third place in the North Division. They lost in the first round of the Big South tournament to Winthrop.

Roster

Schedule

|-
!colspan=9| Regular season

|-
!colspan=9| 2013 Big South Conference men's basketball tournament

References

Radford Highlanders men's basketball seasons
Radford
Radford Highlanders men's b
Radford Highlanders men's b